A metochion or metochi ( or) is an ecclesiastical embassy church within Eastern Orthodox tradition. It is usually from one autocephalous or autonomous church to another. The term is also used to refer to a parish representation (or dependency) of a monastery or a primate.

Ecclesiastical Embassy Church
In the former case, the local territorial church grants a plot of land or a church building for the use of the foreign church being represented, and the location is then considered to belong canonically to the foreign church. Services held there are often in the language appropriate to the church being represented, and the congregation is often made up of immigrants or visitors from the nation associated with that church. Typically, a metochion presence on the territory of an autocephalous church is limited to only a few parishes at most.

Dependency of a monastery
In the case of a monastic metochion, such a parish church is a dependency of a particular monastic community, perhaps receiving clergy from that community or other forms of support. During the Byzantine era, a monastic metochion may have been property granted to a monastery for income purposes.

Metochion is currently employed, as well, to refer to a dependent monastery, skete, kellion (cell) or monastic society that is being given the blessing and support to develop into an autonomous monastery, skete, kellion or society. For an example, Wawasinno Ki'chi Wa Mali'i Waabanowigaan—the Hesychastic Society of the Most Holy Mary—is a Canadian Orthodox hesychastic society founded for (but not to be exclusively of) Aboriginal Orthodox, and which is classified as a metochion of the Monastic Society of St. Silouan the Athonite (OCA, Archdiocese of Canada).

See also 
Metohija, which takes its name from this form of monastery.

Notes

Sources 

 
 
 
 

Eastern Orthodox monasteries
Eastern Orthodox Church
Baroque architecture in Russia
Russian Revival architecture
Greek words and phrases